Janthina is a genus of small to medium-sized pelagic or planktonic sea snails, marine gastropod molluscs in the family Epitoniidae.

Distribution
Species in this genus occur worldwide in tropical, subtropical and warm seas.

Description
These snails are pelagic and live at the surface of the ocean.  Adult snails may not be capable of swimming, and die when they are detached from their rafts; Janthina janthina larvae, however, actively swim in the water column.

The adult snails prey upon (and live near to) one of several species of pelagic animals loosely known as jellyfish. More specifically they eat the medusae of free-swimming Cnidaria, in particular the genus known as "by-the-wind sailors", Velella.

The snails are able to float securely because they create a raft of clear chitin around air bubbles formed near the ocean surface. They anchor to this raft using their foot.  The snails do not have an operculum.

These snails are frequently washed ashore during storms.

The common names for this genus derive from the light purple or violet color of the shells and the violet-colored bodies.  The other genus in the family, Recluzia, has olive-tan colored shells.

Species
<div align=center>
The five extant species of the genus Janthina

</div align=center>

This genus has accumulated a very large number of species names over the centuries. Most of the names that have been given are in fact synonyms of just a few species which have world-wide distributions in tropical waters. Experts disagree about some details of the synonymy.

Species within the genus Janthina include:
 † Janthina chavani (Ludbrook, 1978)
 Janthina exigua Lamarck, 1816 - dwarf janthina
 Janthina globosa Swainson, 1822
 Janthina janthina (Linnaeus, 1758)
† Janthina krejcii Beu, 2017 
 Janthina pallida W. Thompson, 1840
 † Janthina typica (Bronn, 1861) 
 Janthina umbilicata d'Orbigny, 1841
Species brought into synonymy
 Janthina affinis Reeve, 1858: synonym of Janthina janthina (Linnaeus, 1758)
 Janthina africana Reeve, 1858: synonym of Janthina janthina (Linnaeus, 1758)
 Janthina alba Anton, 1838: synonym of Janthina janthina (Linnaeus, 1758)
 Janthina balteata Reeve, 1858: synonym of Janthina janthina (Linnaeus, 1758)
 Janthina bicolor  Menke, 1828: synonym of Janthina janthina (Linnaeus, 1758)
 Janthina bicolor O. G. Costa, 1830: synonym of Janthina janthina (Linnaeus, 1758)
 Janthina bifida Nuttall, 1850: synonym of Janthina exigua Lamarck, 1816
 Janthina britannica Forbes & Hanley, 1853: synonym of Janthina janthina (Linnaeus, 1758)
 Janthina capreolata Montrouzier, 1860: synonym of Janthina exigua Lamarck, 1816
 Janthina carpenteri  Mörch, 1860: synonym of Janthina janthina (Linnaeus, 1758)
 Janthina casta Reeve, 1858: synonym of Janthina janthina (Linnaeus, 1758)
 Janthina coeruleata Reeve, 1858: synonym of Janthina janthina (Linnaeus, 1758)
 Janthina communis Lamarck, 1822: synonym of Janthina janthina (Linnaeus, 1758)
 Janthina contorta Carpenter, 1857: synonym of Janthina janthina (Linnaeus, 1758)
 Janthina costae Mörch, 1860: synonym of Janthina janthina (Linnaeus, 1758)
 Janthina decollata Carpenter, 1857: synonym of Janthina globosa Swainson, 1822
 Janthina depressa Reeve, 1858: synonym of Janthina janthina (Linnaeus, 1758)
 Janthina elongata [sic]: synonym of Janthina globosa Swainson, 1822
 Janthina fibula Reeve, 1858: synonym of Janthina janthina (Linnaeus, 1758)
 Janthina fragilis Lamarck, 1801: synonym of Janthina janthina (Linnaeus, 1758)
 Janthina globosa Blainville, 1822: synonym of Janthina umbilicata d'Orbigny, 1840
 Janthina grandis Reeve, 1858: synonym of Janthina janthina (Linnaeus, 1758)
 Janthina incisa Philippi, 1848: synonym of Janthina exigua Lamarck, 1816
 Janthina involuta Reeve, 1858: synonym of Janthina janthina (Linnaeus, 1758)
 Janthina iricolor Reeve, 1858: synonym of Janthina globosa Swainson, 1822
 Janthina jehennei (Petit de la Saussaye, 1853): synonym of Recluzia jehennei Petit de la Saussaye, 1853
 Janthina laeta Monterosato, 1884: synonym of Janthina pallida W. Thompson, 1840
 Janthina megastoma A. Adams, 1861:  synonym of Janthina umbilicata d'Orbigny, 1840
 Janthina nana Gray, 1842: synonym of Janthina globosa Swainson, 1822
 Janthina nitens  Menke, 1828: synonym of Janthina globosa Swainson, 1822
 Janthina nitida  A. Adams, 1861: synonym of Janthina exigua Lamarck, 1816
 Janthina orbignyi  Mörch, 1860: synonym of Janthina janthina (Linnaeus, 1758)
 Janthina patula Philippi, 1844: synonym of Janthina pallida W. Thompson, 1840
 Janthina payraudeaui Locard, 1900: synonym of Janthina globosa Swainson, 1822
 Janthina penicephela Peron, 1824: synonym of Janthina janthina (Linnaeus, 1758)
 Janthina planispirata   A. Adams & Reeve, 1848: synonym of Janthina janthina (Linnaeus, 1758)
 Janthina prolongata Blainville, 1822: synonym of Janthina globosa Swainson, 1822
 Janthina rosea Anton, 1838: synonym of Janthina pallida W. Thompson, 1840
 Janthina roseala Reeve, 1858: synonym of Janthina janthina (Linnaeus, 1758)
 Janthina roseola Reeve, 1858: synonym of Janthina janthina (Linnaeus, 1758)
 Janthina rotundata Dillwyn, 1840: synonym of Janthina janthina (Linnaeus, 1758)
 Janthina smithiae Reeve, 1858: synonym of Janthina janthina (Linnaeus, 1758)
 Janthina splendens Monterosato, 1884: synonym of Janthina globosa Swainson, 1822
 Janthina striata Montrouzier, 1860: synonym of Janthina exigua Lamarck, 1816
 Janthina striolata  A. Adams & Reeve, 1848: synonym of Janthina pallida W. Thompson, 1840
 Janthina striulata Carpenter, 1857: synonym of Janthina janthina (Linnaeus, 1758)
 Janthina trochoidea Reeve, 1858: synonym of Janthina janthina (Linnaeus, 1758)
 Janthina vinsoni Deshayes, 1863: synonym of Janthina exigua Lamarck, 1816
 Janthina violacea Röding, 1798: synonym of Janthina janthina (Linnaeus, 1758)
 Janthina vulgaris Gray, 1847: synonym of Janthina janthina (Linnaeus, 1758)

References

 Laursen, D. 1953. The genus Ianthina: A monograph. Dana Report 38: 1-40, pl. 1

External links
 https://www.biodiversitylibrary.org/page/16230659 Röding P.F. (1798). Museum Boltenianum sive Catalogus cimeliorum e tribus regnis naturæ quæ olim collegerat Joa. Fried Bolten, M. D. p. d. per XL. annos proto physicus Hamburgensis. Pars secunda continens Conchylia sive Testacea univalvia, bivalvia & multivalvia. Trapp, Hamburg. viii, 199 pp]
 Montfort P. [Denys de. (1808-1810). Conchyliologie systématique et classification méthodique des coquilles. Paris: Schoell. Vol. 1: pp. lxxxvii + 409 [1808]. Vol. 2: pp. 676 + 16 ]
 Gistel, Johannes [Nepomuk Franz Xaver. (1848). Naturgeschichte des Tierreichs: für höhere Schulen. [text book]. 1-216, i-xvi, Plates 1-32. Stuttgart. Scheitlin & Krais.]
 Mörch, O. A. L. (1860). Matériaux pour servir à l'histoire de la famille des Janthines. Journal de Conchyliologie. 8 (3): 261-285
 Iredale, T. (1929). Queensland molluscan notes, no. 1. Memoirs of the Queensland Museum. 9(3): 261-297, pls 30-31
 Kaim, A.; Tucholke, B. E.; Warén, A. (2012). A new Late Pliocene large provannid gastropod associated with hydrothermal venting at Kane Megamullion, Mid-Atlantic Ridge. Journal of Systematic Palaeontology. 10(3): 423-433
 Beu A.G. (2017). Evolution of Janthina and Recluzia (Mollusca: Gastropoda: Epitoniidae). Records of the Australian Museum. 69(3): 119-222
 Gary Rosenberg's Malacolog 4.1.1 info on this genus in the Western Atlantic

Epitoniidae